Cog is an open source audio player for macOS. The basic layout is a single-paned playlist interface with two retractable drawers, one for navigating the user's music folders and another for viewing audio file properties, like bitrate. Along with supporting most audio formats compatible with macOS's Core Audio API, Cog supports a wide array of other audio formats, along with their metadata, which are otherwise unsupported on macOS.

In April 2006, Cog joined other Mac OS X audio software Tag and Max in an effort by the respective authors to consolidate Mac OS X open source audio software on the internet. Subsequently, the Cog website was redesigned to Tag and Max's website design, and its forums were also moved to the Tag and Max Forums. In July 2007, Cog moved to its own separate forums shortly before the release of version 0.06. Last build been created in 2013.

As the original project appears to be abandoned, with the website last updated in 2008, there are now several forks of the project maintained by others. In 2013, Christopher Snowhill started a fork and continues to maintain and develop it as of 2020. In 2015, MacRumors user Vivo made a new audio player Phonix, which is based on original Cog code.

Features

General
 Last.fm support
 Growl support
 Global hotkeys
 File drawer
 Info drawer
 Smart shuffle
 Seeking
 Feedback form
 Automatic Updates (choice of Stable, Nightly, or Unstable)

Audio formats
 AIFF
 Apple Lossless
 Free Lossless Audio Codec (FLAC)
 Monkey's Audio
 MP3
 Musepack
 Ogg Vorbis
 Shorten
 WavPack
 WAV
 Video game music formats (NSF, GBS, GYM, SPC, VGM, HES, etc.)
 tracker formats (IT, S3M, XM, MOD, etc.)
 Cue sheet

Playlist formats
 M3U
 PLS

Metadata formats
 Vorbis comments
 ID3 v1.0, 1.1, 2.3+
 FLAC tags
 APEv1 and APEv2 tags

Languages/Localizations 
 English
 French
 German
 Greek
 Hebrew
 Swedish
 Catalan
 Dutch
 Russian
 Spanish
 Chinese

Known Issues for Mac OS X v10.5 Leopard 
 Playlist issues including "invisible playlist"
 Unattended cross-fade at random times

See also

 Comparison of audio player software

References

External links
 Cog home page
 Cog forums

MacOS media players
Free audio software
Free software programmed in Objective-C
MacOS-only free software